The Roman Catholic Diocese of Juazeiro is a diocese located in the city of Juazeiro in the Ecclesiastical province of Feira de Santana in Brazil.

History
 July 22, 1962: Established as Diocese of Juazeiro from the Diocese of Barra and Diocese of Bonfim

Bishops
 Bishops of Juazeiro (Roman rite), in reverse chronological order
 Bishop Carlos Alberto Breis Pereira, O.F.M. (2016.09.07 - ... )
 Bishop José Geraldo da Cruz, A.A. (2003.06.04 – 2016.09.07)
 Bishop José Rodrigues de Souza, C.Ss.R. (1974.12.12 – 2003.06.04)
 Bishop Tomás Guilherme Murphy, C.Ss.R. (1962.10.16 – 1973.12.29)

Coadjutor bishop
Carlos Alberto Breis Pereira, O.F.M. (2016)

References
 GCatholic.org
 Catholic Hierarchy
 Diocese website (Portuguese)

Roman Catholic dioceses in Brazil
Christian organizations established in 1962
Juazeiro, Roman Catholic Diocese of
Roman Catholic dioceses and prelatures established in the 20th century
Juazeiro